Jerry Ross (born May 11, 1944, in Buffalo, New York) is an American painter.

Early life and work
He was born Gerald Gross to first-generation Jewish parents, Sidney and Jeanette Gross. The family moved to the suburbs (Kenmore and the town of Tonawanda, New York). An art teacher recognized his talent and recommended that he be enrolled at the Art Institute of Buffalo, which he attended from age seven until age eleven. (Neevel 2006, Eugene Weekly, p. 10)

His art teacher, a Mrs. Beagleman, favored an impressionist style of painting, and she continued as his mentor until the art institute closed several years later.  No institution was established to replace the art institute, and as a result Ross had no further formal training. (Eisen 2001, The Torch, p. 10). Ross's work is influenced by the Italian I Macchiaioli and verismo schools of art. He has had exhibitions in Italy, Las Vegas, and Oregon.

Ross was also an influence on his younger sister, Diane (Diane Bush), who became an artist as well, and later a fine art photographer. Ross' first cousin, John Ross, was an author and activist.

To make a living, Ross taught high school advanced math after graduation from SUNYAB and a Peace Corps/Teacher Corps program at Buffalo State (Lackawanna High School and Cardinal O'Hara High Schools). In Arizona he taught general science for Naco Elementary School. After moving to Oregon, he taught math for Lowell High School and, after a brief move to Maryland, taught advanced math for Middletown High School.  Returning to Oregon, he entered a "Computers in Education" MA Degree Program at the University of Oregon, and taught for the Radio Shack Computer Center in Eugene and later, for the ValCom Computer Center.  Hired as Manager for Education and Documentation for the Lane County Regional Information System (RIS) he also moonlighted for Linfield College, teaching computer science.  His last job before retirement was as a full-time instructor for the Computer Information Technology Department of Lane Community College (CIT).

Activist Years
Following high school Ross studied at State University of New York at Buffalo. He became an activist opposed to the Vietnam War (he was one of the "Buffalo Nine" group of defendants), and worked on behalf of the political prisoner Martin Sostre (Heineman 1993, p. 163). He was granted a B.A. in philosophy in 1968. (McQuiddy 2006, p. 76)

Described as "the big one that got away," the conservative press in Buffalo portrayed Ross as a Maoist and atheist who was "scurrilously critical of U.S. policies in Vietnam."  The media indicated that the government may have deliberately targeted him and other anti-war leaders.  According to the Buffalo media, Ross was a go-between for the Buffalo Nine and Martin Sostre, an important political prisoner in New York State whose case was of personal interest to J. Edgar Hoover, then head of the FBI.  FBI efforts to draft Ross had failed because he had so many arrests for his anti-war activities that his court dockets never cleared long enough for the draft board to act.  Also of interest to the FBI was the fact that Ross had been expelled from a Marxist–Leninist group, the Workers World Party (WWP), for "Kautskyism." (Cardinale 1998, p. 6)

Ross's unabashedly leftist and at times strident political position may seem at odds with his paintings, which are imbued with a sense of poetry and calm.  Yet, his lifetime of opposing political systems that he believes deny basic human rights is deeply integrated into an artistic approach that expresses nobility in the human being and value in a nurturing environment.  In life, Ross works for the utopia he creates in his work.  Upon reflection, even his style may be seen to express a political statement.  In his own words, "Only the elite have time to 'finish' paintings."

Life in Oregon

After graduation Ross moved to Arizona and changed his surname to Ross.  While in Arizona, Ross lived in the Hotel Pancho Villa in Naco but traveled to Tucson on weekends. Eventually moving to Tucson, he founded the Tao Te Ching Society and taught tai chi in city parks. Ross had studied Kung fu from Wong Ting Fong in Buffalo and Master Liu in London. Adopting taoism as his outlook, Ross emphasized the four taoist virtues ("remote, foolish, cranky, and poor") and the five excellencies ( Chinese medicine, martial arts, calligraphy, painting, and philosophy).

He later moved to Oregon where he met his wife Angela Czyzewski at Ken Kesey's Poetic Hoohaw in Eugene in May, 1977. He continued teaching tai chi at Hayward Field, at the University of Oregon.  His marriage to his first wife, Pamela Fore Tyree, of Chapel Hill, North Carolina, ended in divorce. Pamela died accidentally in Albuquerque, New Mexico in 2008.

Shortly afterward, Ross was juried into the New Zone Art Collective and helped to found the Downtown Initiative for the Visual Arts (DIVA) in Eugene, Oregon.

Recognized as a painter with vision and facility in a variety of painting styles, Ross was identified as one of a handful of truly mature artists inhabiting the artistic landscape of Eugene, Oregon, where he has now worked for over 25 years.(Keefer 2001, Eugene Register-Guard, pp. 1–2B.  Another observer described Ross as a "master of portraiture."  His talents are evident in the portrait of his wife Angela, entitled Arrivo a Bologna, which was considered one of his best: "subtle, tender, suggestive, spare in composition and palette." (Pederson 2005, Eugene Weekly, p. 29).  This work has the unflinching directness that characterizes all of Ross's portraits, an approach that is aided by his tendency to choose models who themselves express confidence and strength.

In Oregon, Ross has created a home base where he continues to perfect his technique.  He teaches in Eugene and maintains a studio where the craft of painting is as much his concern as his chosen subjects.

Arts Activism
As an arts activist in Eugene, Oregon, Ross helped sustain the New Zone Art Collective for many years.  The New Zone Gallery is today a not-for-profit tax-exempt cooperative gallery located in Eugene, Oregon, which emphasizes the work of its members.  The gallery was established in 1983 to further, develop, and foster interest in experimental visual arts and to encourage artists with like interests.  Ross worked to prevent loss of New Zone's tax-exempt status and to keep it alive online during a period of gallery homelessness.

In 1991, Ross founded the popular Salon des Refuses art show. After his work was rejected from the annual Mayor's Art Show in Eugene, Ross planted an easel outside of the exhibition's reception as a gesture of public protest.  He was joined by other artists whose works were similarly rejected and who ultimately formed their own alternative exhibition, the Salon des Refuses, which has been held every year since 1991.  (McQuiddy 2007, p. 43)

Italian Connection
Ross and his wife Angela travel frequently to Italy, which continues to be the inspiration for many works.  Early in the series of journeys to Italy, Ross realized his affinity with the I Macchiaioli movement (Tuscany).

By the early 1980s, Angela and Jerry Ross had become Italophiles.  They made their first trip to Italy in 1991, attended a "Satellites in Education" conference in Bari, and then spent one month exploring both the popular destinations, such as Rome, Venice and Florence, as well as lesser known areas along the Adriatic and in the north.  After their return, Angela continued university studies in Italian language and literature, during which time she and Jerry attended a lecture at the University of Oregon given by visiting professor Pier Cesare Bori, a leading Italian scholar on Russian philosopher/writer Leo Tolstoy. They instantly became good friends with Bori who invited them to spend time in Italy at his writing study/apartment in Livergnano, Italy.  Jarman 2000, p. 3)  Known as "Liver and onions" to the GIs who fought there in WWII, Livergnano became Ross's home for three months in Summer, 1996.  There he painted the landscape and portraits of the local inhabitants.  After meeting some of the ex-GIs who were re-visiting battlefields, Ross eventually joined the 361st Infantry Battalion Association.  He has attended their reunions and made videos interviewing survivors who had fought the Nazis in the Apennines. (Livengood 1994)
As a student of the philosophy and writings of the Italian philosopher, Antonio Gramsci, in June, 2002, Ross presented a paper, entitled "Global Technology Education in the Context of The Gramscian World View,"  before an international economics conference in Rome   (Delener 2002, p. 1035) The conference was organized by the Global Business and Technology Association.

Ross's painting career began to take off in 1999 with an exhibition at the American Consulate in Milan, Italy.  This was followed by a second show at the Consulate in 2000 and two more shows in Italy that year Cafe Cabiria, Florence, Italy in Piazza S. Spirito and at the Municipio of the Comune di Loiano ((Bologna)). In 2001, Ross had a solo show in Rome at the prestigious Galleria d'Arte La Borgognona.  He was also awarded a gold medal in a painting competition in Corsico, near Milan, along with an invitation to exhibit there in May, 2006.

In Italy, Ross has discovered an environment congenial to his style of painting.  The age-old appreciation for painting in Italy and the Italian concept of verismo encourage him to paint in a manner that rings true.  Ross's "discovery" of Italy has rewarded him as an artist.  He is attracted to the time-honored tradition of the "veduta," views and cityscapes that express underlying messages about life and the quality of life.  While he often chooses the wilder views not favored by "postcard painters," each of his subjects nevertheless reveals the mark of man, the evidence of human habitation and integration into the land.

Evolution of Painting Style

Ross's painting style has been influenced by Abstract Expressionism, particularly the work of Willem de Kooning and Richard Diebenkorn. This influence is revealed in his bold use of color and his expressive, experimental handling of pigment.  His painterly style utilizes a technique borrowed from Francis Bacon (mild distortions) but, as seen in the Portrait of Carlo Bianchi, it also references photography and computer imagery.  Ross has also been influenced by Umberto Coromaldi (Rome 1870-1948, Telemaco Signorini (Florence, 1835–1901), and most recently, Domenico Morelli (Napoli, 1823–1901).

Ross works in a variety of moods—simple, elegant portraits; soft, earth-toned landscapes; and studies of historical work based on old master paintings.  The latter are not literal copies but rather abstract compositions that "show the power of the old master's sense of composition and form." (Keefer 2005, pp. G3-G4)  As time goes on, Ross is increasingly interested in scenes of contemporary working class life.  He approaches such subjects without a shrill, messianic desire to foment action, but to work with the idea of expressing an abstract notion of social harmony.  So, Ross's subject matter is strong, but restful, while his style and handling of paint convey a gestural energy that keeps each canvas lively.

Recently, Ross's emphasis has changed somewhat, demonstrating a greater interest in figurative work.  Working quickly with an economy of expression, Ross has created multi-figure Italian beach scenes in a style he calls American verismo.  These are related to his earlier old master studies.  "In those paintings, the blocked-in compositions are borrowed—-'quoted' might be the correct postmodern term—-from classical European painting masters."
(Keefer 2007, pp. 1–2, Art Section).  Beach paintings like Martinsicuo have provided Ross with an outlet for combining his interests in Italy and the human form.

Important Exhibitions
 1988 New Zone Art Gallery—two-person show, group shows
 1989 Hult Center, Mayor's Art Show -- Portrait after Oreshnikov
 1991 Founding Salon des Refuses Show -- Portrait after Frans Hals
 1994 Hult Center, Mayor's Art Show -- L.A. Rebellion
 1995 Hult Center, Mayor's Art Show -- Portrait of Bob Devine
 1999 Comune di Loiano, Italy (June 17-July 3)
 1999 American Consulate in Milan, Italy
 1999 Collier House (Faculty Club), University of Oregon, Eugene, Oregon
 2000 American Consulate in Milan, Italy
 2000 Cafe Cabiria, Florence, Italy (Piazza S. Spirito)
 2000 Comune di Loiano, Loiano (Bologna), Italy
 2000 Mayor's Choice Award, Mayor's Show, Eugene, Oregon -- La Mamma
 2001 Provenance Gallery, Eugene—solo show
 2001 Jacob's Gallery -- Art in History, Science, and Culture
 2001 31st Annual Willamette Valley Juried Show, Corvallis, Oregon
 2001 Rome, Italy, Galleria d' Arte La Borgognona
 2002 Rome, Italy, Galleria d' Arte La Borgognona
 2003 Chetwynd-Stapleton Gallery, Portland
 2003 Marghitta Feldman Gallery—solo show
 2004 "Connections" Contemporary Arts Collective, Las Vegas, Nevada
 2004 Barrios Cafe, Milan, Italy
 2004 Salon des Refuses at DIVA -- Portrait of Carlo Giuliani
 2005 Adam's Place and Luna's Jazz Center
 2006 Le Loggia della Fornace, Rastignano, Italy -- Colori d'Europa
 2006 Milano Opening Centro Foscolo, Comune di Corsico
 2006 Comune di Loiano Sala Fantazzini di Loiano
 2006 Mayor's Art Show, Eugene, Oregon
 2006 Jacobs Gallery Eugene, Oregon
 2007 The Springfield Museum, Springfield, Oregon—solo exhibition
 2008 TrackTown USA—Maude Kerns—Eugene, May 30 
 2008 Olympic Trials Exhibit—Eugene Airport, June–July 
 2008 Eugene Mayor's Art Show September-Oct 
 2008  November - DIVA Gallery One—Nov 25 thru December
 2009 "Uprising" Springfield Museum January 30-February 21
 2009 20th Annual Juried Show Las Vegas, February 5 - March 27
 2009 World Art Expo 2009: June 7–14 Orange County, CA
 2009 Grand Salon Des Arts gallery. (Brea Galler, Orange County, CA 
 2010 LaFollette Gallery, One Person Show, April and May 
 2010 Open Studio American Academy in Rome, Italy, Dec 12th 
 2011 The Eugene Jazz Station 124 W. Broadway Two month exhibit
 2011 "La Poetica del vero"—Eugene Yoga Center, Sept-Oct 
 2011 Eugene Mayor's Show 2011, Sept-Oct 8th 
 2011 Visual Arts Showcase—Beaverton, Oregon, Nov 4-13 
 2012 Runyan Gallery, Nye Beach Newport, March 2 - April 2 
 2012 August 1 - August 15 Buffalo, NY:  "RELATED" a 4-person show at Queen City Gallery, Buffalo, New York 
 2012 Eugene Mayor’s Show, Sept-Oct
 2012 October Brownville Art Association, Brownsville, OR  "Club Macchia" exhibit
 2013 March 27 Open Studio, American Academy in Rome
 2013 April 25-May 15 Terni, Italy Comune di Terni Centro Via Aminale
 2013 August 1 - August 31 - Club Macchia Group Show, Brownsville Art Center, Brownsville, OR
 2013 Sept 1 - Sept 30, Out on a Limb Gallery, E. Broadway, Eugene
 2014 Feb-Mar Randy's Cafe in Brownsville: 13 paintings
 2014 March Eugene City Bakery: 10 paintings
 2014 August - October 4 Eugene Mayor's Show
 2015 March 27-May 2 "The Macchia Six" group show at the Jacobs Gallery
 2016 April 23  at Villa San Carlo Borromeo in Senago (near Milan) the painting "La Tavola Italiana" by Jerry Ross and sculpture: "La Tavola Italiana" by Giovanni Smeraldi.
 2017 Here for All Exhibit Umpqua Community College, Roseburg, OR
 2017 Jim Tronson Gallery 740 Main Street, Springfield, OR Oct-Nov Tues-Sat 1-4 pm 
 2017-2018 November–April US Federal Building, Eugene, OR "Faces and Places"
 2019 Sept 5TH AND 6TH ANNUAL Barbizon Brownsville Paintout
 2019 July-Oct Cafe Soriah, Eugene, Oregon
 2019 Nov 9 - Dec 21st About Light 700 SW Madison Ave Corvallis, OR 
 2020 January Emerald Art Center 500 Main Street Springfield, Oregon

Awards and recognitions
 Jerry Ross has been honored in Eugene, Oregon, with many local awards for his paintings, including Mayor's Art Show awards for La Mamma: Portrait of Stephania Mastrocinque and Vedova di Guerra: War Widow.
 In 2001, he received a Juror's Award at the 31st Annual Willamette Valley Juried Show in Corvallis, Oregon.
 In 1996, he came in second place in a painting competition held in Livergnano, Italy.
 In 2005, he won a gold medal and one-person show in Milan, Italy, as a result of a competition held in Corsico (Milan), Italy, sponsored by "Il gruppo cesare Frigerio."
 The Milan jurors wrote that Ross's work represented "un naturalismo di matrice novecentesca ed un cromatismo tonale di forte effetto plastico costruiscono un'atmosfera compostamente poetica" ("a sort of naturalism founded upon a twentieth-century matrix and a tonal type of chromatism with a strong, sculptural effect, to construct a composed, poetic atmosphere."
 Selected to give a presentation (in Italian) for "La Tavola Italiana" and the unveiling of the painting "La Tavola Italiana" 2016 April 23 at Villa San Carlo Borromeo in Senago, near Milan.
 Jerry Ross was juried (2020) into Galerie Sonia Monti 6, avenue Delcassé 75008 Paris, France that now represents his work.
 The Burchfield Penny Art Center (Museum) in Buffalo, NY accepted "Portrait of Martin Sostre" into its permanent collection after it was donated by the author, Ron Ford (December, 2020).
 American Society for Aesthetics, Rocky Mountain Meeting July 2021 in Santa Fe, New Mexico research paper and presentation "American Verismo, WWII Oral Histories, Portraiture, and the Documentary Film Genre." https://jerryrosspittore.com/ASApaper2021.pdf and powerpoint notes, http://jerryrosspittore.com/SantaFe.pdf

References

External links
"Official Home Page for Artist" 

1944 births
20th-century American painters
American male painters
American contemporary painters
Postmodern artists
Living people
American portrait painters
Artists from Buffalo, New York
Fine art photographers
20th-century American male artists